This list of ornithopod type specimens is a list of fossils serving as the official standard-bearers for inclusion in the species and genera of the dinosaur clade Ornithopoda, which includes the line of herbivorous dinosaurs culminating in the duck-billed hadrosaurs. Type specimens are definitionally members of biological taxa and additional specimens can only be "referred" to these taxa if an expert deems them sufficiently similar to the type.

The list

See also
 List of marginocephalian type specimens
 List of thyreophoran type specimens
 List of other ornithischian type specimens

References

Lists of dinosaur specimens
Mesozoic fossil record
Ornithopods